Lenia Fabiola Ruvalcaba Álvarez (born 23 April 1986) is a Mexican visually-impaired judoka. Competing in the 70 kg division she won a silver medal at the 2008 Paralympics and a gold at the 2016 Rio Games. Ruvalcaba also took part in regular judo competitions and won a team bronze medal at the 2010 Central American and Caribbean Games. In 2011, she participated both at the Pan American and Parapan American Games.

By earning gold in Rio, Ruvalcaba became the first Mexican female to win an Olympic or Paralympic judo tournament.

Ruvalcaba won one of the bronze medals in the women's 70 kg event at the 2020 Summer Paralympics held in Tokyo, Japan.

References

1986 births
Living people
Sportspeople from Guadalajara, Jalisco
Mexican female judoka
Paralympic judoka of Mexico
Paralympic gold medalists for Mexico
Paralympic silver medalists for Mexico
Medalists at the 2016 Summer Paralympics
Medalists at the 2008 Summer Paralympics
Judoka at the 2008 Summer Paralympics
Judoka at the 2012 Summer Paralympics
Judoka at the 2016 Summer Paralympics
Paralympic medalists in judo
Medalists at the 2011 Parapan American Games
Medalists at the 2015 Parapan American Games
Medalists at the 2019 Parapan American Games
20th-century Mexican women
21st-century Mexican women